Taavi Teplenkov (born 2 May 1975 in Tallinn) is an Estonian actor.

Since 1998 he works at Estonian Drama Theatre. Besides theatrical roles he has also played on several films and television series.

Roles

Film roles
 Must veri (2002)
 Detsembrikuumus (2008)
 Püha Tõnu kiusamine (2009) 
 Punane elavhõbe (2010)
 Taevalaul (2010)
 Rotilõks (2011)
 Vasaku jala reede (2012)
 Nullpunkt (2014)

Television roles
 Pehmed ja karvased (2003–) 
 Õnne 13 (2004)
 Riigimehed (2010)
 Heeringas Veenuse õlal (2011)
 Mustad lesed (2015) 
 Hetk ajaloos (2018)

References

Living people
1975 births
Estonian male film actors
Estonian male stage actors
Estonian male television actors
21st-century Estonian male actors
Estonian Academy of Music and Theatre alumni
Male actors from Tallinn